Linwood is a neighborhood in Cincinnati, Ohio, United States. The population was 705 at the 2020 census.

History
Linwood was incorporated as a village in 1874. Originally part of Spencer Township, the east side village was annexed by the City of Cincinnati in 1893. In the 19th century, Linwood was situated on the Little Miami Railroad.

References

Neighborhoods in Cincinnati
Former municipalities in Ohio